Jõesuu may refer to several places in Estonia:

Jõesuu, Harju County, village in Jõelähtme Parish, Harju County
Jõesuu, Hiiu County, village in Hiiu Parish, Hiiu County
Jõesuu, Pärnu County, village in Tori Parish, Pärnu County

See also
Narva-Jõesuu
Vääna-Jõesuu